Roland Schwartzl (born 10 December 1980 in Lienz) is a decathlete from Austria.

He has won 5 pole vault and 3 heptathlon tiles since 1999 in the Austrian Indoor Championships. He also won both the decathlon and long jump in the Austrian Championships in 2003. His greatest achievement as a junior came in the 1999 European Junior Championships where he won the decathlon.
He is currently married to his long time girlfriend, Rameera Jaj. He is currently working in UCSI international school Subang as a physical Education teacher.

Achievements

References
roland-schwarzl.com
gbrathletics
gbrathletics

External links

Living people
Austrian decathletes
Austrian male pole vaulters
Athletes (track and field) at the 2004 Summer Olympics
Olympic athletes of Austria
1980 births
People from Lienz
Sportspeople from Tyrol (state)